Az Zawiyah Governorate was one of the governorates (muhafazah) of Libya from 1963 to 1983. Its capital was Zawiya. It was created out of the northwestern part of Tripolitania province. 

The governorate's population was 190,708 in 1964 and had risen to 231,242 by 1972.

Notes

Governorates of Libya
Tripolitania